Charlène G. von Saher (born 4 December 1974) is a British former competitive figure skater. The daughter of a West German skater, von Saher spent most of her life in Greenwich, Connecticut and trained alongside Nancy Kerrigan under coaches Evy Scotvold and Mary Scotvold. She won the gold medal at the 1993 British Championships and then finished 12th at the 1993 World Championships. Despite withdrawing from the 1994 national championships with a severe case of the flu, she was selected to represent Great Britain at the 1994 Winter Olympics. She finished 15th at the Lillehammer Games.

She is the granddaughter of Dési von Halban and Jacques Goudstikker, and the great-granddaughter of Selma Kurz. Since the 1990s, she has assisted her mother in fighting for restitution of Nazi-looted art that belonged to her grandfather. She spoke at the opening of the exhibition Reclaimed - Paintings from the Collection of Jacques Goudstikker at the Contemporary Jewish Museum. The exhibition was organized as a way to gain publicity for the issue of Nazi plunder and to show the works included in the 2006 Goudstikker restitution of 202 paintings. The heirs continue their search for lost paintings and have successfully negotiated additional restitutions since 2006.

Results

References

External links
 

1974 births
Living people
British female single skaters
Figure skaters at the 1994 Winter Olympics
Olympic figure skaters of Great Britain
English people of Dutch-Jewish descent